Viridovix was the chief of Unelli, a Gallic tribe which faced the legions of Julius Caesar at the time of the Roman conquest of Gaul, between 58 and 51 BC.

He assumed the command of a Gallic army of Lexovii and Aulerci Eburovices against the legate Quintus Titurius Sabinus, against whom he suffered a defeat in 56 BC.

In popular culture
One of the main characters of the fantasy novel series The Misplaced Legion (also known as The Videssos Cycle or The Legion Cycle) by Harry Turtledove is a Gaulish chief named Viridovix. While he comes from the same time period as the historical Viridovix, he is stated to be Lexovii rather than Unelli, and has other differences in his biography, making it likely that he is a composite character, loosely based on the historical figure.

Sources
Commentarii de Bello Gallico, Book 3, 17—19

Celtic warriors
Gaulish rulers
Barbarian people of the Gallic Wars
1st-century BC rulers